George Chapman (c. 1559–1634) was an English dramatist, translator, and poet.

George Chapman may also refer to:

 George Chapman (murderer) (1865–1903), Polish-born English serial killer aka Sverin Antoniovich Klosowski
 George Chapman (healer) (1921–2006), British trance healer and medium
 George Chapman (cricketer) (1904–1986), Australian cricketer
 George Chapman (footballer, born 1886) (1886–?), Scottish footballer with Blackburn Rovers and Rangers
 George Chapman (footballer, born 1920) (1920–1998), English footballer with Brighton & Hove Albion
 George Chapman (businessman), businessman from Queensland, Australia
 George B. Chapman (1925–2016), Georgetown University professor and biologist
 George W. Chapman (footballer) (1909–1980), Australian rules footballer for St Kilda between 1931 and 1935
 George L. Chapman (1909–2003), Australian rules footballer for Fitzroy in 1932 and St Kilda in 1933
 George Chapman (party president) (born 1927), New Zealand political leader
 George Henry Chapman (1832–1882), American Civil War general
 George W. Chapman (politician), American lawyer and politician from New York
 George Thomson Chapman (1824–1881), New Zealand merchant, bookseller and publisher
 George W. Chapman (c. 1900–1970), First National Chief of the Order of the Arrow